Brian Halligan is an American executive and author. He is the co-founder of Propeller, a venture capital fund targeting climate change through investment in the earth's most precious resource, its oceans. He is the co-founder and executive chairman of HubSpot, a CRM platform for scaling companies based in Cambridge, Massachusetts, and is also a senior lecturer at MIT. Halligan uses the term inbound marketing to describe the type of marketing he advocates.

He has co-authored two books on marketing: Inbound Marketing: Get Found Using Google, Social Media, and Blogs with HubSpot co-founder Dharmesh Shah and Marketing Lessons from the Grateful Dead: What Every Business Can Learn from the Most Iconic Band in History with David Meerman Scott.

Early life, education, and career
Halligan was born in Westwood, Massachusetts, and grew up and attended public schools in Westwood, Massachusetts. He received a Bachelor of Science degree in Electrical Engineering from the University of Vermont and an MBA from MIT Sloan School of Management in 2005.

His career began at Parametric Technology Corporation in several roles leading up to senior vice president of the Pacific Rim. Wanting to work in a smaller company, he joined Groove Networks as vice president of sales, where he worked from 2000 to 2004 before it was acquired by Microsoft and rebranded as Microsoft SharePoint Workspace.

After a period as a venture partner at Longworth Ventures he co-founded HubSpot in June 2006. In HubSpot's 2020 Year In Review, the company reported $880 million in total revenue and 4,551 employees with headquarters in Cambridge, MA and offices in Dublin, Ireland (EMEA HQ); Berlin; Singapore; Sydney, Australia; Tokyo, Japan; and Portsmouth, NH, and San Francisco, CA He credits the company's success, in part, to innovations like the "Alpha, Beta, Version One" policy, in which employees begin proving their ideas might profit the company "nights and weekends" (the alpha phase) before receiving additional resources (the beta and version one phases).

Brian is a Corporation Member of the Woods Hole Oceanographic Institution. From 2014 to 2016, Halligan also served on the board of directors of Fleetmatics,  a provider of fleet management software, leading up to their acquisition by Verizon for $2.4 billion.

Publications, speeches, and awards
Halligan's first book, Inbound Marketing, was co-authored with HubSpot co-founder Dharmesh Shah. The thesis of the book is that because people now block marketing that interrupts them, such as advertisements and spam, companies need to instead provide information that is useful to prospects, who will then self-identify. Reviewing the book, Meryl Evans said that it contains "elementary stuff..." but it "does a good job for those who don’t have a clue about how to use social media for business." It was also reviewed in The Boston Globe. As of July 2011, the book was in its seventh printing, had sold 40,000 copies, and had been translated into nine languages.
The book was revised and updated in 2014 in a second edition.
His second book, Marketing Lessons, was co-authored with David Meerman Scott. It uses the marketing activities of the rock band The Grateful Dead as an example of this. Scott Kirsner, reviewing this book in The Boston Globe, mentions that the authors say that they were inspired, in part, by an article in The Atlantic by Joshua Green. In 2017, Halligan purchased the "Wolf" guitar once owned by Garcia for $1.9M at a charity auction. An anonymous donor made an additional donation of $1.6M and so the total benefit the Southern Poverty Law Center was $3.5M.

Halligan speaks on marketing and business topics, including at TEDx. He was an entrepreneur in residence at MIT and is a senior lecturer, teaching "Designing, Developing, and Launching Successful Products in an Entrepreneurial Environment". He previously taught "Entrepreneurial Product Development and Marketing" with Elaine Chen.  
Halligan has been named to Glassdoor’s annual top CEO list several times, listed by Comparably as one of the Top 5 Best CEOs of a Large Company as well as Top 5 Best CEOs for Women and for Diversity.
He is also an occasional lecturer at Sloan on the science of selling and marketing.

Daniel Lyons incidents
In his book Disrupted: My Misadventure in the Start Up Bubble, which is sharply critical of HubSpot's management and culture, former HubSpot employee Daniel Lyons accused Halligan of age discrimination.

Materials obtained under the Freedom of Information Act showed that certain Hubspot executives working under Halligan considered the book "a financial threat to HubSpot, its share price, and the company’s future potential." The FBI report discusses "tactics such as email hacking and extortion" in the attempt to prevent the book from being published.

Halligan was forced to pay financial penalties by the HubSpot board of directors because he failed to promptly alert the board after he discovered that staff members at HubSpot behaved inappropriately. "There was definitely some fishiness. But I didn’t report it. That was my bad," Halligan said about the incident.

References

External links
 About the authors page at Wiley for Inbound Marketing...
 About the authors page at Google Books from Marketing Lessons...

1967 births
American business theorists
American business writers
American technology chief executives
American technology writers
Business speakers
Living people
Marketing people
Marketing speakers
MIT Sloan School of Management alumni